Emphreus pachystoloides is a species of beetle in the family Cerambycidae. It was described by Lacordaire in 1872, originally under the genus Phrynesthis. It is known from Malawi, Mozambique, Kenya, Zimbabwe, the Democratic Republic of the Congo, and Zambia.

References

Stenobiini
Beetles described in 1872